William Wood (1816 – 19 June 1872) was a British Whig politician.

Wood was first elected Whig MP for Pontefract in 1857, but stood down at the next election in 1859.

References

External links
 

Whig (British political party) MPs for English constituencies
UK MPs 1857–1859
1816 births
1872 deaths